TV Sing Along with Mitch is an album by Mitch Miller and The Gang. It was released in 1961 on the Columbia label (catalog nos. CL-1628 and CS-8428). The album debuted on Billboard magazine's popular albums chart on June 12, 1961, peaked at No. 3, and remained on that chart for 40 weeks.

Track listing
Side 1
 Medley: "California" and "Avalon"
 "I Found a Million Dollar Baby (In a Five and Ten Cent Store)
 "Breezein' Along with the Breeze"
 "Happy Days Are Here Again"
 Medley: "Has Anybody Seen Kelly" and "I've Got Rings on My Fingers"
 "Shuffl Off to Buffalo"

Side 2
 Medley: "Moonlight Bay" and "There's Yes! Yes! In Your Eyes"
 "The Love Nest"
 "Would You Like to Take a Walk"
 Medley: "You Must Have Been a Beautiful Baby" and "If I Could Be with You"
 "It's Only a Paper Moon"
 "Auf Widersehen, My Dear"

References

1961 albums
Columbia Records albums
Mitch Miller albums